Bowmore ('Big Bend') is a small town on the Scottish island of Islay. It serves as administrative capital of the island, and gives its name to the noted Bowmore distillery producing Bowmore single malt scotch whisky.

History 

Bowmore is a planned village with wide streets on a grid-iron pattern. It has its origins in an earlier settlement, Kilarrow, which until c. 1770 occupied the site of the present grounds of Islay House near Bridgend.

In May 1685, Kilarrow was the scene of the first stages of Argyll's Rising, when rebels under the Earl of Argyll arrived from Netherlands in an unsuccessful attempt to overthrow King James II and VII.

As part of his plans for improvements at Islay House, Daniel Campbell the Younger initiated the construction of the new village in 1770, just after the completion of the new  Kilarrow Parish Church, which was built in a unique circular shape. The old village of Kilarrow and its church dedicated to St Maelrhuba, were then demolished, and its residents were relocated to the new village of Bowmore. Kilarrow Old Churchyard still exists close to the site of the former village.

The Bowmore distillery came into operation some time before 1816 and is situated on the shores of Loch Indaal. In the 1980s, one of the distillery's warehouses was gifted to the community for conversion to a swimming pool and leisure centre. Named the Mactaggart Centre after one of the scheme's major donors, Sir John Mactaggart, it uses an innovative system of underground pipes to transfer waste heat from the distillery to the water for the swimming pool.

Bowmore in WWII 
There was a RAF seaplane base at Bowmore during the Second World War called RAF Bowmore. Short Sunderland and Consolidated PBY Catalina flying boats operated from Loch Indaal. Some of the wartime film Coastal Command was filmed in Bowmore - fictional name RAF Ferry Bay - and it features a shot of a Sunderland flying low over the main street of Bowmore and over Kilarrow Parish Church.

Facilities 
Bowmore has several hotels, restaurants, shops, a hospital, a high school and is home to the Ìleach newspaper, community newspaper of the year 2006. Bowmore is also host to Ionad Chaluim Chille Ìle (the Columba Centre), a cultural centre and college founded with the aim of promoting Gaelic language revival and heritage on the Island.

Noted residents 
 Donald Caskie, noted as the "Tartan Pimpernel" for his wartime exploits in France, is one of Bowmore's most noted sons. He was responsible for the safe passage of numerous exiles through the Scots Kirk in Paris during World War II, risking both life and limb. 
 In more recent times, Glenn Campbell can be seen regularly on BBC Scotland as their political correspondent.
 William Livingstone (1808-1870), an important figure in 19th-century Scottish Gaelic literature and chronicler of the Highland Clearances upon Islay, was born upon Gartmain farm near Bowmore.

Gallery

References

External links 

Ileach Community Newspaper

Villages in Islay